Bicycling is a cycling magazine published by Hearst in Easton, Pennsylvania.  


History
Bicycling started in 1961 as Northern California Cycling Association Newsletter, a four-page mimeographed newsletter (8 ½ x 14) started by Peter Hoffman. It covered the local bicycle scene and grew quickly as Vol. 1 No. 6 took on a 5 ½ x8 ½ offset printing format in December, 1961. The name was changed to American Cycling Newsletter with Vol. 3 No. 1 in March, 1964 issue. The name was changed again with Vol. 5 No. 1 in March, 1965 to American Cycling. The size was changed to a larger format with Vol. 5 No. 1 in March, 1966 to 8 ½ x 11. Peter Hoffman sold the magazine to Leete Publications in August 1968 but stayed on as an editor until late 1969. The last American Cycling titled magazine was the Nov. 1968 issue, Vol. 7 No. 8.  The name was changed to Bicycling! with the Dec 1968 Issue Vol 7 No 9. For three months following the name change, "American Cycling" was included on the cover in small print under the Bicycling! masthead. NCCA Newsletter and American Cycling were published 10 times a year, March though December; however, in 1968 -the first year under Leete- there were only 9 issues. Leete skipped the October issue and called it November both to make it more current, and because they were behind in production as they worked on the design change to Bicycling!.  After 1968 the magazine went to publishing 12 issues a year.   Pricing of the magazine changed over the years as follows July 62 to December 64, 25 cents, March 65 to June 67, 35 cents, July 67 to July 68, 45 cents, In August 1968 with the Leete purchase the price went up to 50 cents, and the covers were changed to full color; the previous covers had been in red and black.

In April 1973, the magazine was acquired by Capital Management Publications.  In early December 1977, Rodale, Inc. in Emmaus, Pennsylvania sent a team to California to arrange to buy Bicycling!.  Rodale acquired Bicycling! from Capital Management Publications and published their first issue in February, 1978.  In 1980, Rodale purchased a smaller magazine, Bike World, and merged it into Bicycling!. In 1982 Rodale bought American Cyclist and incorporated it into Bicycling.  Under Rodale's ownership, the magazine also published a number of books about bicycles and bicycling.

Hearst announced its acquisition of Rodale in 2017. Hearst moved Bicycling to Easton, Pennsylvania in 2018.

Projects and compilations
BikeTown Africa is a project that started in 2006 as a partnership between Bicycling, Rodale, Inc., Bristol Myers Squibb, and Kona Bicycle Company. The project donates bicycles to healthcare workers in Africa, particularly those involved in HIV/AIDS related work. Bicycling then documents the impact these bicycles have on the personal and professional lives of the recipients, such as in the May 2010 issue, where Dr. Travis (of the daytime television talk show The Doctors) is interviewed about his involvement in BikeTown (among other things). In the same issue, Bicycling compiled a list of the 50 most bike-friendly cities in the United States, with Minneapolis, Minnesota as number one.

Book publishing
 David H Bryan, T L Gettings, Bicycling and photography, 1979, 
 David Lynn Smith, Eugene A Gaston, Get fit with bicycling, 1979, 
 Basic riding techniques, 1979, 
 Richard Jow, Reconditioning the bicycle, 1979, 
 Basic bicycle repair, 1980, 
 Marcia Holoman, John Schubert, et al., The Most frequently asked questions about bicycling, 1980, 
 Best bicycle tours, 1980, 
 Bicycling's best tours, 1980, 
 Norman Sheil, Pat Griffith, Grand Prix training manual II, 1982/1984, 
 The bicycling users' magazine, 1982, 
 Bicycle Repair, 1985
 Easy Bicycle Maintenance, 1985
 Complete Guide to Bicycle Maintenance and Repair, 1986
 Susan Weaver, Ride like a pro, 1988, 
 Cycling for Women, 1989
 New Bike Owner's Guide, 1990
 Long-Distance Cycling, 1993

References

External links
 
 Bicycling on Rodale's corporate website
 Bicycling at Google Books
 Bicycling magazine reviews, MTBR.com (a mountain biking website, so reviews tend to be biased towards mountain bikes, despite Bicycling being geared towards on-road cycling—and Mountain Bike targeted towards mountain biking)

Lifestyle magazines published in the United States
Cycling magazines
Fitness magazines
Monthly magazines published in the United States
Magazines established in 1961
Magazines published in Pennsylvania
Rodale, Inc.
Magazines published in North Carolina
Ten times annually magazines